The 1976 Fiesta Bowl was the sixth edition of the college football bowl game, played at Sun Devil Stadium in Tempe, Arizona on Saturday, December 25. Part of the 1976–77 bowl game season, it matched the eighth-ranked Oklahoma Sooners of the Big Eight Conference and the unranked Wyoming Cowboys of the Western Athletic Conference (WAC). Heavily-favored Oklahoma won in a rout, 41–7.

This was the first of four consecutive Fiesta Bowls played on Christmas Day.

Teams

This was the first Fiesta Bowl appearance for each. Both teams' offenses ran out of the wishbone formation.

Oklahoma

Oklahoma was co-champion of the Big Eight Conference for the fifth straight year. They tied Texas and lost to the other co-champions, Oklahoma State and Colorado: CU went to the Orange Bowl and OSU played in the Tangerine Bowl.

Wyoming

Wyoming was co-champion of the Western Athletic Conference (WAC) and was making their first bowl appearance in nine years, since the 1968 Sugar Bowl. It was the Cowboys' first winning season since 1969.

Game summary
This was the only game of the day, and kicked off shortly after 1 p.m. MST on CBS.

Elvis Peacock started the beating with a touchdown run early in the game and Horace Ivory added in his touchdown run to make it 14–0 after the first quarter. Two Uwe von Schamann field goals made it 20–0 at halftime.

Oklahoma scored three more times in the second half on Peacock, George Cumby, and Woodie Shephard touchdowns. Narrowly avoiding a shutout, Cowboy fullback Robbie Wright scored in the final half-minute to cap a 92-yard drive and make the final score 41–7. This was the biggest margin of victory in the Fiesta Bowl until 1996.

Sooner quarterback Thomas Lott was the offensive MVP and cornerback Terry Peters took the defensive honor.

Scoring
First quarter
 Oklahoma – Elvis Peacock 3-yard run (Uwe von Schamann kick)
 Oklahoma – Horace Ivory 4-yard run (von Schamann kick)
Second quarter
 Oklahoma – von Schamann 32-yard field goal
 Oklahoma – von Schamann 50-yard field goal
Third quarter
 Oklahoma – Peacock 15-yard run (von Schamann kick)
Fourth quarter
 Oklahoma – George Cumby 4-yard run (von Schamann kick)
 Oklahoma – Woodie Shephard 8-yard run (von Schamann kick)
 Wyoming – Robbie Wright 1-yard run (Dan Christopulos kick)

Statistics
{| class=wikitable style="text-align:center"
! Statistics !! Oklahoma  !! Wyoming
|-
| First Downs || 24|| 14
|-
| Yards Rushing|| 76–415|| 42–153
|-
| Yards Passing || 23 || 51
|-
| Passing || 3–5–0 || 6–19–5
|-
| Return Yards || 19|| 0
|-
| Total Offense || 81–438 || 61–204
|-
|Punts–Average ||0–0|| 5–25.2
|-
|Fumbles–Lost ||6–3|| 5–1
|-
|Turnovers|| 3|| 6
|-
|Penalties–Yards ||2–20|| 4–30
|}

Aftermath
Oklahoma climbed to fifth in the final AP poll. The Sooners returned to the Fiesta Bowl six years later; through , this is Wyoming's only appearance.

References

External links
 Fiesta Bowl – December 25, 1976

Fiesta Bowl
Fiesta Bowl
Oklahoma Sooners football bowl games
Wyoming Cowboys football bowl games
December 1976 sports events in the United States
Fiesta Bowl